"Green" is the lead single by the American singer-songwriter Brendan James, from his first studio album The Day Is Brave. The song has been featured in the Lifetime's hit show, Army Wives.

Background
The song is about a former girlfriend he met while working at Urban Outfitters. "She was just a really special girl," Brendan said, "and after we broke up, I looked back and realized she was always wearing green."

Music video
The music video for "Green" was directed by Josh Franer. In the video, Brendan's driving in a car (70 Mercury Cougar owned by Stuart Nembrotti) and passing through from place to place where he and his girlfriend were met, and recalling the girl he used to love and the things they've been through.

Reception
The song has received positive review from Entertainmentopia.
“Green" picks up a faster, more energetic tempo, leaving the remaining cuts in the doldrums of slow, sometimes plodding, yet melodic music. -Entertainmentopia

References

2008 singles
American pop songs
2008 songs
Decca Records singles